Sir David Ernest Hutchins FRGS (22 September 1850 – 11 November 1920) was a British forestry expert who worked around the British Empire.

Hutchins was educated at Blundell's School and the École nationale des eaux et forêts (National School of Water Resources and Forestry) at Nancy, France. He then joined the Imperial Forestry Service in India, in which he served for ten years, then served for another 23 years in the South African Forest Service, where he recommended that a Forest Service be started in the Transvaal and that certain Mexican pine species, such as Pinus patula, be cultivated. He finally served three years in the British East Africa Forest Service, from which he retired as Chief Conservator of Forests. In 1908 and 1909, he explored the forests around Mount Kenya.

After his retirement, he reported on the forests of Cyprus in 1909 for the Colonial Office, toured the forests of Australia in 1914–1915 for the government of Western Australia, and in 1916 toured the forests of New Zealand to compile a report for the Dominion government.

He was knighted in the 1920 New Year Honours.

Brachylaena hutchinsii, a species of African tree in the family Asteraceae, was named after him.

Footnotes

References
Obituary, The Times, 3 December 1920
Who Was Who
Biography National Library New Zealand

External links
 

1850 births
1920 deaths
People educated at Blundell's School
Imperial Forestry Service officers
Colonial Forest Service officers
Knights Bachelor
Fellows of the Royal Geographical Society
French National School of Forestry alumni
South African foresters
Forestry in India
British foresters